Lindum railway station is located in the Bayside suburb of Lindum, on the Cleveland line in Queensland, Australia. It primarily services the Brisbane suburb of Lindum and the predominantly industrial areas of Hemmant. Iona College, a secondary school, is situated at its Lindum address adjacent to the railway station. 

The location of "Lindum" was once a suburb named for a residential house in the area. In the 1980s, Lindum ceased to exist as a suburb and is now recognised as a locality within the broader suburb of Wynnum West.

In November 1996, the Fisherman Islands line to the Port of Brisbane opened to the north of the station. It branches off to the east of the station.

Incidents
In February 2019, an elderly woman died after being struck by a train while crossing the tracks.

Two years later a 32-year-old woman died after her car was struck while on the crossing.

Services
Lindum is served by Cleveland line services from Shorncliffe, Northgate, Doomben and Bowen Hills to Manly and Cleveland.

Services by platform

References

External links

Lindum station Queensland Rail
Lindum station Queensland's Railways on the Internet
[ Lindum station] TransLink travel information

Railway stations in Brisbane